Rough Bank, Miserden is a  biological Site of Special Scientific Interest in Gloucestershire, notified in 1986. It was purchased by the wildlife charity Butterfly Conservation in 2012.

Habitat and flora
The site lies in the Cotswold Area of Outstanding Natural Beauty near Miserden and is one of several sites of ancient herb-rich pasture which remain in the area.  It lies on Jurassic limestone.

The grassland includes upright brome, tor-grass, sheep's fescue and a range of plants which flourish on calcareous soils.  These include autumn gentian, clustered bellflower, common calamint, ploughman's spikenard and rock rose. There are large quantities of kidney vetch on the site.

A wide range of orchids flourish including fly orchid, bee orchid, green-winged orchid, fragrant orchid and the greater butterfly orchid. Pyramidal orchids grow in abundance.

Woodland and scrub areas support such plants as broad-leaved helleborine, white helleborine and nettle-leaved bellflower.  Columbine is recorded.

The reserve is biologically rich – the main area of flower-rich grassland is a Site of Special Scientific Interest (SSSI) and is home to 33 species of butterfly, 42 species of nationally scarce and rare moths and 12 species of orchid.

The Rough Bank sward is full of characteristic lime-loving plants such as horseshoe vetch, autumn gentian, clustered bellflower, ploughman's spikenard and rock rose.

The impressive abundance of orchids includes early purple, fly, bee, fragrant, lesser butterfly, pyramidal and autumn lady's tresses.

The Rough Bank site was purchased by Butterfly Conservation in 2012 with the help of a significant grant from Natural England, funding from The Gloucestershire Naturalists Society and generous donations from many individual supporters. It has become part of the Cotswolds Commons and Beechwoods National Nature Reserve (NNR) and is managed in collaboration with Natural England and the National Trust.

Directions
Arriving by public transport is possible on the number 23 bus from Stroud, alighting at The Camp. Buses are limited so please check the timetable on the day you intend to travel.

The reserve entrance is at SO914 087 just south of The Camp – a small hamlet on the minor road called Calf Way which connects the B4070 (Birdlip to Stroud road) with Bisley.

The nearest post code is: GL6 7HN

Continue through The Camp on to Calf Way and when you reach the fork in the road, head to the right - the entrance is a few minutes further down the road on your right.

There is a small car park inside the reserve entrance - the traffic is fast along this road so please take great care when turning in and out and be aware of riders using the bridleway. There is no safe roadside parking and the gateway should not be blocked when the car park is closed, as farm machinery needs access at all times.

Fauna
The rich flora support a diverse range of invertebrates, and butterflies include chalkhill blue, small blue, green hairstreak and the marbled white. There are species of snail, ant and woodlouse recorded and there are old ant hills present.

References

SSSI Source
 Natural England SSSI information on the citation
 Natural England SSSI information on the Rough Bank, Miserden unit

External links
 Natural England (SSSI information)

Sites of Special Scientific Interest in Gloucestershire
Sites of Special Scientific Interest notified in 1986
Cotswolds